Packwood House is a timber-framed Tudor manor house in Packwood on the Solihull border near Lapworth, Warwickshire.  Owned by the National Trust since 1941, the house is a Grade I listed building. It has a wealth of tapestries and fine furniture, and is known for the garden of yews.

History 
The house began as a modest timber-framed farmhouse constructed for John Fetherston between 1556 and 1560. The last member of the Fetherston family died in 1876.  In 1904 the house was purchased by Birmingham industrialist Alfred Ash. It was inherited by Graham Baron Ash (Baron in this case being a name not a title) in 1925, who spent the following two decades creating a house of Tudor character. He purchased an extensive collection of 16th- and 17th-century furniture, some obtained from nearby Baddesley Clinton. The great barn of the farm was converted into a Tudor-style hall with sprung floor for dancing, and was connected to the main house by the addition of a Long Gallery in 1931.

In 1941, Ash donated the house and gardens to the National Trust in memory of his parents but continued to live in the house until 1947 when he moved to Wingfield Castle.

Gardens 
The famous Yew Garden containing over 100 trees was laid out in the mid-17th century by John Fetherston, the lawyer. The clipped yews are supposed to represent "The Sermon on the Mount". Twelve great yews are known as the "Apostles" and the four big specimens in the middle are 'The Evangelists'. A tight spiral path lined with box hedges climbs a hummock named "The Mount". The single yew that crowns the summit is known as "The Master". The smaller yew trees are called "The Multitude" and were planted in the 19th century to replace an orchard.

The Yew Garden is entered by raised steps and a wrought-iron gate. The garden path follows an avenue of trees, which leads up a spiral hill where a wooden seat is placed beneath a yew tree. This vantage point provides views of the house and the Yew Garden.

The soil on the estate has a high level of clay, which is detrimental to the trees during wet periods. As a result, parts of the garden are often closed to the public while restoration work is undertaken The house and gardens are open to the public throughout the whole year as of 2013.

Gallery

Footnotes

Sources

External links

 Packwood House, National Trust

Further reading 
   A History of the County of Warwick, Volume 5 (1949) from British History Online
 Andy Sturgeon, The Late Summer Border at Packwood House, The Guardian, September 15 2007

National Trust properties in Warwickshire
Grade I listed buildings in Warwickshire
Tudor England
Historic house museums in Warwickshire
Gardens in Warwickshire